This Ride is the sixth album by American country music singer Jerrod Niemann. It is his first release for Curb Records, and it was issued on October 6, 2017. The album includes the single "A Little More Love", a duet with labelmate Lee Brice.

Content
The album's first two singles, "A Little More Love" and "God Made a Woman", respectively charted at No. 28 and No. 55 on Country Airplay in advance of the album's release.

Critical reception
Rating it 3.5 out of 5 stars, Stephen Thomas Erlewine of AllMusic wrote that "Maybe Niemann will never be as weird as he was on Free the Music, but on This Ride he manages to convey his own amiable, slightly left of center personality within mainstream country-pop, and that's more than enough." Markos Papadatos of Digital Journal rated the album "A", saying that "there is something in it for everybody" and praising "God Made a Woman" as the strongest song.

Commercial performance
The album debuted at No. 28 on the Country Album Sales chart, selling 1,400 copies in the first week.

Track listing

Personnel
 Lee Brice – duet vocals on "A Little More Love"
 Eric Darken – percussion
 Luke Dick – electric guitar
 David Dorn – keyboards
 Kenny Greenberg – e-bow, electric guitar, slide guitar
 Wes Hightower – background vocals
 Evan Hutchings – drums, keyboards, percussion, programming, synthesizer
 Gene Johnson – background vocals on "I Ain't All There"
 Charlie Judge – Hammond B-3 organ, keyboards, piano, synthesizer, strings, string arrangements
 Troy Lancaster – electric guitar
 Blair Masters – clavinet, keyboards, piano, programming, synthesizer, Wurlitzer
 Rob McNelley – acoustic guitar, electric guitar
 Lance Miller – background vocals
 Carl Miner – acoustic guitar
 Greg Morrow – drums
 Jerrod Niemann – lead vocals, background vocals
 Nick Norman – background vocals
 Jimmy Olander – electric guitar on "I Ain't All There"
 Russ Pahl – steel guitar
 Danny Rader – banjo, bouzouki, acoustic guitar, resonator guitar, mandolin
 Kip Raines – percussion
 Marty Roe – background vocals on "I Ain't All There"
 Justin Schipper – steel guitar
 Adam Shoenfeld – electric guitar
 Jimmie Lee Sloas – bass guitar, electric guitar, Hammond B-3 organ, ukulele
 Russell Terrell – background vocals
 Ilya Toshinsky – acoustic guitar
 Derek Wells – electric guitar
 Dana Williams – background vocals on "I Ain't All There"
 John Willis – acoustic guitar
 Nir "Z" Zidkyahu – drums, programming

References

2017 albums
Jerrod Niemann albums
Curb Records albums
Albums produced by Jimmie Lee Sloas